Marguerita Dams (born 5 March 1947) is a former Belgian racing cyclist. She won the Belgian national road race title in 1968.

References

External links
 

1947 births
Living people
Belgian female cyclists
People from Geel
Cyclists from Antwerp Province